Tarentola annularis, also known as the white-spotted wall gecko or ringed wall gecko, is a species of gecko. It is native to northern Africa.

References

Tarentola
Reptiles described in 1827